The Old Manatee County Courthouse, built in 1859–1860, is an historic building located at 1404 Manatee Avenue East, in Bradenton, Florida. It was Manatee County's first courthouse and is the oldest surviving Florida county courthouse (that was built originally as one) left in the state, and is now part of the Manatee Village Historical Park. On June 29, 1976, it was added to the U.S. National Register of Historic Places. After it ceased being used as a courthouse, it became the Manatee Methodist Church and the Manatee Methodist Church Parsonage.

See also
 Manatee County courthouses (disambiguation)

References

Bradenton, Florida
Manatee
National Register of Historic Places in Manatee County, Florida
Buildings and structures in Manatee County, Florida
Government buildings completed in 1860
1860 establishments in Florida
Courthouses on the National Register of Historic Places in Florida